BlackBerry Tablet OS is an operating system from BlackBerry Ltd based on the QNX Neutrino real-time operating system designed to run Adobe AIR and BlackBerry WebWorks applications, currently available for the BlackBerry PlayBook tablet computer.
The BlackBerry Tablet OS is the first tablet running an operating system from QNX (now a subsidiary of RIM).

BlackBerry Tablet OS supports standard BlackBerry Java applications.  Support for Android apps has also been announced, through sandbox "app players" which can be ported by developers or installed through sideloading by users. A BlackBerry Tablet OS Native Development Kit, to develop native applications with the GNU toolchain is currently in closed beta testing. The first device to run BlackBerry Tablet OS was the BlackBerry PlayBook tablet computer.

A similar QNX-based operating system, known as BlackBerry 10, replaced the long-standing BlackBerry OS on handsets after version 7.

See also

 BlackBerry OS
 BlackBerry 10

References

External links 
 Meet the Power Behind the BlackBerry Tablet OS, official announcement, QNX website
 Blackberry - Playbook development Overview

ARM operating systems
Tablet OS, BlackBerry
Computing platforms
Embedded operating systems
Lightweight Unix-like systems
Microkernel-based operating systems
Mobile operating systems
Real-time operating systems
Tablet operating systems